William Joseph Kennedy (born January 16, 1928) is an American writer and journalist who won the 1984 Pulitzer Prize for his novel Ironweed.

Many of his novels feature the interactions of members of the fictional Irish-American Phelan family in Albany, New York. The novels make use of incidents from the city's history as well as the supernatural. Kennedy's works include The Ink Truck (1969), Legs (1975), Billy Phelan's Greatest Game (1978), Ironweed (1983), Roscoe (2002) and Changó's Beads and Two-Tone Shoes (2011). One reviewer said of Changó's Beads and Two-Tone Shoes that it was "written with such brio and encompassing humanity that it may well deserve to be called the best of the bunch".

Kennedy also published a nonfiction book entitled O Albany!: Improbable City of Political Wizards, Fearless Ethnics, Spectacular Aristocrats, Splendid Nobodies, and Underrated Scoundrels (1983).

Early life
Kennedy was born and raised in Albany, New York, the son of William J. Kennedy and Mary E. McDonald. Kennedy was raised a Catholic, and grew up in the North Albany neighborhood. He attended Public School 20 and Christian Brothers Academy. Kennedy studied at Siena College in Loudonville, New York, from which he graduated in 1949.

Career
Kennedy began pursuing a career in journalism after college by joining the Post Star in Glens Falls as a sports reporter. He was drafted in 1950 and served in the US Army, where he worked for an Army newspaper in Europe. After his discharge, Kennedy joined the Albany Times Union as a reporter. He then relocated to Puerto Rico in 1956 and became managing editor of the San Juan Star, a new English language newspaper. While living in San Juan, he befriended the journalist and author Hunter S. Thompson, a friendship that continued throughout their careers.

While in Puerto Rico Kennedy also met his mentor, Saul Bellow, who encouraged him to write novels.

Kennedy, who had been eager to leave Albany, returned to his hometown and worked for the Albany newspaper the Times Union as an investigative journalist, writing stories exposing activities of Daniel P. O'Connell and his political cronies of the dominant Democratic Party. His use of Albany as the setting for eight of his novels was described in 2011 by book critic Jonathan Yardley as painting "a portrait of a single city perhaps unique in American fiction".

Kennedy has received numerous honorary degrees, and was presented with the inaugural SUNY Medallion of Distinction in May 2012 by the Chancellor of the State University of New York, and so joined the ranks of the SUNY Distinguished Academy as a board-appointed Distinguished Professor.

Kennedy lectured in creative writing and journalism from 1974 to 1982 at the University at Albany, becoming a full professor in 1983. He taught writing as a visiting professor at Cornell University during the 1982–1983 academic year.

Awards
Kennedy received the 1984 Pulitzer Prize for Fiction for his novel Ironweed. He also won the National Book Critics Circle Award.
 
In 2001, he received the Peggy V. Helmerich Distinguished Author Award from the Tulsa Library Trust.

William Kennedy received the Fitzgerald Award for Achievement in American Literature award in 2007, which is given annually in Rockville, Maryland where F. Scott Fitzgerald, his wife, and his daughter are buried.

Personal life
In Puerto Rico, Kennedy met and married Daisy (Dana) Sosa. They have three children.

Bibliography

Fiction
The Ink Truck. New York: Viking Press, 1969.

The Albany Cycle
Legs. New York: Coward, McCann & Geoghegan, 1975.
Billy Phelan's Greatest Game. New York: Viking Press, 1978.
Ironweed. New York: Viking Press, 1983.
Quinn's Book. New York: Viking Press, 1988.
Very Old Bones. New York: Viking Press, 1992.
The Flaming Corsage. New York: Viking Press, 1996.
Roscoe. New York: Viking Press, 2002.
Changó's Beads and Two-Tone Shoes. New York: Viking Adult, 2012.

Nonfiction
O Albany!: Improbable City of Political Wizards, Fearless Ethnics, Spectacular Aristocrats, Splendid Nobodies, and Underrated Scoundrels. New York: Viking Press, 1983.
The Making of Ironweed. New York: Viking Penguin, 1988.
Riding the Yellow Trolley Car. New York: Viking Press, 1993.

Screenplays
The Cotton Club. Co-authored with Francis Ford Coppola. New York: St. Martin's Press, 1986.
Ironweed. Tri-Star, 1987.

Plays
Grand View. Premiered at Capital Repertory Theatre, Albany, New York, 1996.
In the System. HumaniTech* Short Play Project Premiere, University at Albany, March 2003.

Children's books
Charlie Malarkey and the Belly Button Machine (co-authored with Brendan Kennedy). New York: Atlantic Monthly Press, 1986.
Charlie Malarkey and the Singing Moose (co-authored with Brendan Kennedy). New York: Viking Children's Books, 1994.

Criticism
Flanagan, Thomas. O Albany!. New York Review of Books. April 25, 2002
Giamo, Benedict F. The Homeless of Ironweed: Blossoms on the Crag. Iowa City: University of Iowa Press, 1997.
Gillespie, Michael Patrick. Reading William Kennedy. Syracuse: Syracuse University Press.
Lynch, Vivian Valvano. Portraits of Artists: Warriors in the Novels of William Kennedy. Bethesda: International Scholars Publications, 1999.
Mallon, Thomas. William Kennedy's Greatest Game. The Atlantic Monthly. February 2002.
Seshachari, Neila C. Courtesans, Stars, Wives, & Vixens: The Many Faces of Female Power in Kennedy's Novels, AWP Conference, Albany, NY. April 17, 1999.
Marowski, Daniel G. and Matur, Roger, editors. "William Kennedy." Contemporary Literary Criticism, Vol. 53, Detroit: Gale Research, 1989, pp. 189–201.
Michener, Christian. From Then into Now: William Kennedy's Albany Novels. University of Scranton Press, 1998.
Reilly, Edward C. Twayne's United States Authors Series: William Kennedy. Boston: Twayne Publishers, 1991.
Van Dover, J. K. Understanding William Kennedy. Columbia, SC: University of South Carolina Press, 1991.
Seshachari, Neila C., editor. Conversations with William Kennedy. Jackson, MS: University Press of Mississippi, 1997.

See also
University at Albany – Famous Faculty
John William Ward (professor)

References

External links

Finding Aid for the Papers of William Kennedy,
Audio recording of William Kennedy reading from unpublished works at the Key West Literary Seminar, 2009
Write TV Public Television Interview with William Kennedy
2011 radio interview at The Bat Segundo Show
M. E. Grenander Department of Special Collections and Archives, University at Albany Libraries.
New York State Writers Institute Biography of Kennedy, University at Albany.

1928 births
Living people
American newspaper journalists
20th-century American novelists
21st-century American novelists
American people of Irish descent
MacArthur Fellows
Members of the American Academy of Arts and Letters
Writers from Albany, New York
Pulitzer Prize for Fiction winners
Siena College alumni
University at Albany, SUNY faculty
American male novelists
Journalists from New York (state)
PEN/Faulkner Award for Fiction winners
American Book Award winners
20th-century American male writers
21st-century American male writers
Novelists from New York (state)
21st-century American non-fiction writers
American male non-fiction writers
Commandeurs of the Ordre des Arts et des Lettres